Stefan de Walle (born 15 September 1965) is a Dutch actor.

Career 

De Walle is known for his role of Kees in the spin-off television series of the 1986 film Flodder, which ran from 1993 to 1998. He also played this role in the 1995 film Flodder 3.

In 2011, he succeeded Bram van der Vlugt in the role of Sinterklaas who played the role from 1986 till 2010.

Selected filmography 

 1995: Once Beaten, Twice Shy
 1995: Flodder 3
 2004: Tow Truck Pluck
 2005: Offers
 2006: Keep Off
 2012: De Marathon
 2014: Secrets of War
 2018: Craving
 2021: My Best Friend Anne Frank

References

External links 
 

1965 births
Living people
20th-century Dutch male actors
21st-century Dutch male actors
Dutch male actors
Dutch male film actors
Dutch male television actors